Mills-Screven Plantation, also known as Hilltop, is a historic plantation house located near Tryon, Polk County, North Carolina.  The main house was built about 1820 and later expanded into the 1840s, and is a long two-story, seven bay, Federal / Greek Revival style frame dwelling.  It features a two-tier, three-bay, pedimented Ionic order portico.  Also on the property are the contributing stone springhouse, guesthouse part of which is said to have been a slave cabin, double pen log crib, and a larger 20th century frame barn.

It was added to the National Register of Historic Places in 1983.

The original owners were slaveholders ohn McIntire and Govan Mills (1805-1862).

References

Plantation houses in North Carolina
Houses on the National Register of Historic Places in North Carolina
Greek Revival houses in North Carolina
Federal architecture in North Carolina
Houses completed in 1840
Houses in Polk County, North Carolina
National Register of Historic Places in Polk County, North Carolina
Slave cabins and quarters in the United States